NSTL refers to the

National Software Testing Laboratories in Blue Bell, Pennsylvania
National Soil Tilth Laboratory in Ames, Iowa
former National Space Technology Laboratory, now John C. Stennis Space Center in Hancock County, Mississippi
National Standards Testing Laboratory in Rockville, Maryland
National Tree Seed Laboratory, Dry Branch, Georgia
Navigation Systems & Technology Laboratory at NASA's Johnson Space Center in Houston
National Strategic Target List of the Single Integrated Operational Plan
National Security Threat List, sets out FBI's foreign counterintelligence mission
Virtual Journal of Nanoscale Science & Technology, University of California
National Science and Technology Library, China
Naval Science and Technological Laboratory, An Indian national defense laboratory under DRDO, located in Visakhapatnam, Andhra Pradesh.